Chiclayo may refer to:
Chiclayo, a city in Peru.
Chiclayo District, a district in the Chiclayo Province.
Chiclayo Province, a province in the Lambayeque Region in Peru.